Dixons Unity Academy, formerly Swallow Hill Community College is an educational secondary school Academy located in Leeds, West Yorkshire, England. It is sponsored by Dixons Academies Trust, having formerly been sponsored by Academies Enterprise Trust (AET).

The school became sponsored by Dixons Academies Trust in October 2018, following a negative Ofsted report, and changed its name.

History
Swallow Hill Community College was built to replace two former schools: West Leeds High School and Wortley High School. West Leeds High School opened in 1907 based at the Old School Lofts building on Whingate. West Leeds High School had separate Girls and Boys sites, with girls based initially on Congress Mount until they finally merged into a new school site in the 1940s.

In 2006 the local authority gained agreement from the Department for Children, Schools and Families to rebuild the schools. Construction begun in 2008, on the fields opposite to the West Leeds High School site and the £25 million build was completed by August 2009. It was decided to call the new school Swallow Hill, in order to reflect the local area of Swallow Hill (The area located between both predecessor schools).

In September 2009 Swallow Hill Community College opened with Bernard Knowles as the headteacher, using the two sites of West Leeds High School and Wortley High School. The main site with the older pupils was located on the fields of the previous West Leeds High school with a capacity for 1,200 students. The younger pupils (Years 7 and 8) were located at the site which had been previously the Wortley High School buildings, as the full school roll was 1600 pupils in 2009. Due to falling pupil numbers, in July 2011 the Wortley High School site was closed and all students were moved to the Upper Site, so that the school became a single-site school in September 2011. The old Wortley High School site was knocked down in 2013 and as of 2015 all that remains are the fields and tennis courts. By 2014 pupil numbers had dropped to 1,055 Pupil numbers continued to drop and in December 2015 the Academy recorded on its website that its pupil numbers were 908 students.

In July 2013 Swallow Hill became an academy, sponsored by AET (Academies Enterprise Trust). The CEO of Academies Enterprise Trust, Ian Comfort summed up the purpose of AET's role by stating on the Academy website: 

Dixons Academies Trust took over the school and renamed it Dixons Unity Academy in October 2018.

Academic standards

Cells coloured red represent 5GCSE A*-C (including English and Maths) results which are below the minimum standards expected by the Government floor target, or OFSTED grades which indicate that standards need to be improved or Department for Education letters stating that standards are 'unacceptably low.' Cells in darker grey indicate periods of time when the Academy was not part of the Academies Enterprise Trust network of academies.

In January 2013 it was noted that Swallow Hill was amongst three schools in Leeds which achieved exam results which placed it in the lowest achieving 40 schools nationally. In the city of Leeds as a whole 55% of pupils achieved 5 GCSEs at grades A*-C (including English and Maths) but at Swallow Hill it was only 28%. The BBC also ranked the school 37th out of 38 local schools for both GCSE Value Added and for Sixth Form results

Once Swallow Hill Community College became an AET Academy, standards fell, as recorded by the official league table data above. Swallow Hill records its examination results in a more optimistic way than the official government league tables do. So, commenting on the 2014 results, the Academy stated "Students at Swallow Hill achieved the academy’s best ever results this Summer despite a national picture which saw many schools’ results dip." The official Government league tables (as in the table above) record a drop in results of 3% in 2014.

On 6 January 2015 Paul Smith, the DFE Regional Schools' Commissioner wrote to AET expressing concerns about standards at Swallow Hill Community College, especially as recorded in the 2014 exam results. He stated 

On 3 February 2015 OFSTED inspected the Academy and graded it as overall Inadequate because of poor achievement. OFSTED stated

The 2015 examination results, as indicated in the table above, showed further decline in the headline figure of students achieving 5GCSEs A-C (including English and Maths). Commenting on the 2015 exam results the Academy initially declined to release exam results at all, and posted the following statement on its website, which was still up in December 2015, 

The 2015 initial reports of A level results indicated that 13 students had passed qualifications at the Academy. Official league tables show that Sixth Form students achieved on average an E grade for each qualification.

Extra Curricular matters
In order to improve students employability, Business Mentoring of younger pupils took place at the Academy in 2014 Recognising the importance of broadening the curriculum to meet the needs of the many lower ability pupils the academy has developed a number of outreach programmes. In 2014 Swallow Hill embarked upon a partnership with the Leeds College of Building to provide more vocational courses for students unable to access the full curriculum. In May 2015 pupils from Swallow Hill participated in a Young Persons Fire Training scheme.

In March 2011 Rachel Reeves, MP, visited Swallow Hill and promoted visits to Auschwitz

In order to attract staff to the Academy AET stated in its adverts  However, in response to community perceptions of high staff turnover, a 2015 Freedom of Information Request showed that the Academy had a staff turnover of 27% of teachers.

A minor local controversy erupted upon the merger of the schools when a 6th Form pupil made a video of complaints and posted it on YouTube to complain about the poor standards in the school. He highlighted concerns about 6 fights in 2 weeks and a number of timetable irregularities. Attached to the video clips in question were pictures and comments added by other students, added in different years, to highlight concerns about bullying and other matters within the Academy.

The Academy is particularly proud of its hygiene, celebrating the achievement of a 5* rating for food hygiene again in 2015.

The role of the sponsor
Academies Enterprise Trust support for Academies at the local level is led by the AET Regional Director of Education (known as a RDE). The 2014 OFSTED report about AET explained that ‘some academy leaders said that there was too much variability in the support and challenge offered by Regional Directors employed by AET.'. Nevertheless, there are some positive comments about the efforts and intentions of the sponsor which can be found in reports, but with the direction of results so clearly downwards, it was not surprising in 2015 to find an increasing amount of concern being expressed.

On 3 February 2014, as a result of seeing plans for a joint venture which would have involved staffing changes at all AET schools, including Swallow Hill Community College, Averil Chambers, on behalf of the GMB Union, made a series of criticisms of AET. She stated

In 2015 The DfE Schools' Commissioner Paul Smith, also expressed concerns about AET's ability to bring about the necessary improvements at Swallow Hill Community College. He stated 

When OFSTED carried out a monitoring visit in June 2015, they expressed concerns about Academies Enterprise Trust and its plans for the school. OFSTED stated 

In December 2015 the Times Educational Supplement (TES) reported that AET has received 14 warning letters from the government about unacceptably low standards in its academies and that this is more than any other chain has received. Commenting more generally the TES said

References

External links
 

Secondary schools in Leeds
Academies in Leeds